This is a list of electoral district results for the 1944 Queensland state election.

Results by electoral district

Albert

Aubigny

Barcoo

Baroona

Bowen

Bremer

Brisbane

Bulimba

Bundaberg

Buranda

Cairns

Carnarvon

Carpentaria

Charters Towers

Cook

Cooroora

Cunningham

Dalby

East Toowoomba

Enoggera

Fassifern

Fitzroy

Fortitude Valley

Gregory

Gympie

Hamilton

Herbert

Ipswich

Isis

Ithaca

Kelvin Grove

Kennedy

Keppel

Kurilpa

Logan

Mackay

Maranoa

Maree

Maryborough

Merthyr

Mirani

Mundingburra

Murrumba

Nanango

Normanby

Nundah

Oxley

Port Curtis

Rockhampton

Sandgate

South Brisbane

Stanley

The Tableland

Toowong

Toowoomba

Townsville

Warrego

Warwick

West Moreton

Wide Bay

Windsor

Wynnum

See also 

 1944 Queensland state election
 Candidates of the Queensland state election, 1944
 Members of the Queensland Legislative Assembly, 1944-1947

References 

Results of Queensland elections